Puchezh is a port town and the administrative center of Puchezhsky District in Ivanovo Oblast, Russia, located on the west side of the Volga River,  east of Ivanovo, the administrative center of the oblast. Population:

History
It was first mentioned as Puchishche sloboda in 1594. In the 19th century, it became a center for the grain industry and the flax trade. In 1862, a major thread-producing plant was founded. Nearby Ivanovo's weaving industry was fed off of Puchezh's flax trade and a large number of female workers would move there seeking employment.

In 1952, Gorky Reservoir flooded, putting the town in danger. For the next three years, the town slowly uprooted itself, was carried to a higher location, and was rebuilt.

Administrative and municipal status
Within the framework of administrative divisions, Puchezh serves as the administrative center of Puchezhsky District, to which it is directly subordinated. Prior to the adoption of the Law #145-OZ On the Administrative-Territorial Division of Ivanovo Oblast in December 2010, it used to be incorporated separately as an administrative unit with the status equal to that of the districts.

As a municipal division, the town of Puchezh is incorporated within Puchezhsky Municipal District as Puchezhskoye Urban Settlement.

Economy
Today, Puchezh still maintains a flax enterprise and a sewing factory. The town's industries now include a plant producing reinforced concrete works, a woodworking industry, and their cultural pride, the Istoki factory.  Istoki is an artistic trade that involves making works of traditional embroidery, both by hand and by machine, to make patterns influenced by the ancient art from the Volga region.

References

Notes

Sources

Cities and towns in Ivanovo Oblast
Yuryevetsky Uyezd